James Alexander Craig Thom (May 26, 1933 – January 30, 2023) was an American author, best known for his works in the Western genre and colonial American history which are noted for their historical accuracy borne of his painstaking research. Thom graduated from Butler University in 1961 with a BA in Journalism after serving in the United States Marine Corps in the Korean War. He taught a course in journalism at Indiana University, and was a contributor to The Saturday Evening Post.

Personal life and death 
Thom married Dark Rain in 1990. Dark Rain is co-author with Thom of the books Warrior Woman and The Shawnee: Kohkumthena's Grandchildren. His website describes her as the Water Panther Clan Mother of the East of the River Shawnee of Ohio.

Thom died on January 30, 2023, at the age of 89.

Works
 Let the Sun Shine In (a collection of short stories) (Gibson Publishing, 1976)
 Spectator Sport (a novel about the tragic events of the 1973 Indianapolis 500 auto race) (iUniverse, 1978)
 Staying Out of Hell (Ballantine Books, 1985)
 Long Knife (a novelized biography of General George Rogers Clark, victor of the Battle of Fort Sackville in Vincennes, Indiana, and conqueror of the Northwest Territory) (Avon, 1979)
 From Sea to Shining Sea (a novelized biography based on the lives of the John and Ann Rogers Clark family, their 10 children which included brothers General George Rogers Clark and  Captain William Clark of the Lewis and Clark Expedition to the Pacific) (Villard Books, 1981)
 Panther in the Sky (a novelized biography of Tecumseh, the Shawnee Indian chieftain) (Ballantine Books, 1989)
 Follow the River (based on the Draper's Meadow massacre of 1755) (Ballantine Books, 1981)
 Red Heart (Random House, 1997)
 Sign Talker (a novelized biography of George Drouillard, who was with Lewis and Clark and the Corps of Discovery expedition) (Ballantine Books, 2000)
 The Children of First Man (a novelization of the genesis and the demise of the Mandan Indian Tribe) (Fawcett, 1995)
 St. Patrick's Battalion (a novel about Saint Patrick's Battalion in the Mexican–American War of 1846) (Ballantine Books, 2006)
 Warrior Woman (with Dark Rain Thom, a novel about the life of Shawnee peace chief Nonhelema, born ca. 1720) (Random House, 2007)
 The Art and Craft of Writing Historical Fiction (Writer’s Digest Books, 2010)

Film adaptations
 Tecumseh: The Last Warrior (1995), TV-movie based on his novel Panther in the Sky

References

External links

 Website 

1933 births
2023 deaths
20th-century American novelists
American male journalists
American male novelists
Writers from Bloomington, Indiana
Butler University alumni
20th-century American male writers
Novelists from Indiana
20th-century American non-fiction writers
21st-century American male writers
21st-century American novelists
21st-century American non-fiction writers
Journalists from Indiana
People from Wayne County, Indiana
United States Marine Corps personnel of the Korean War